Greatest Hits is a compilation album by the rock group Joan Jett and The Blackhearts, released March 9, 2010 through Jett's label Blackheart Records. It includes two discs of 21 songs in total and features Jett's three songs that charted in the US top ten: "I Love Rock 'n' Roll", "Crimson and Clover", and "I Hate Myself for Loving You". In 2013, the album was released in Australia featuring two new songs ("TMI" and "Reality Mentality") added to the end of the second disc, which were later included on  Unvarnished. A new version of "I Love Playin' with Fire" (originally by Jett's former band The Runaways) was appended as an iTunes Store and Japanese bonus track.

A single disc budget version was released in 2019 on Blackheart/Sony Legacy containing 12 songs.

Track listing

Charts

References

2010 compilation albums
Joan Jett compilation albums
Blackheart Records albums